Victory Boulevard is a major east-west arterial road that runs  traversing the entire length of the San Fernando Valley in Los Angeles County, Southern California, United States.

Geography
Victory Boulevard is approximately 25 miles (40 km) long, and is notable for several reasons. Victory Boulevard is the street where one will find the West Valley's major malls at Fallbrook Center and Westfield Topanga, through the Warner Center business district, along a section of the Metro G Line and by three of its stations, past Pierce College, through the Sepulveda Basin Recreation Center with Lake Balboa, Pedlow Skate Park and golf courses, then through the communities of Van Nuys, Valley Glen and North Hollywood in the center of the valley, crossing the Tujunga Wash, and continuing past Valhalla Memorial Park Cemetery with its Portal of the Folded Wing, through Burbank's entertainment district, passing the Nickelodeon studios at Olive Avenue, then veering southeast to its eastern terminus at Griffith Park near the Los Angeles Zoo and Travel Town Museum (at the intersection of Riverside Drive & Sonora Avenue).

Victory Boulevard is one of three Los Angeles boulevards included in the lyrics of Randy Newman's song "I Love L.A.": "...Century Boulevard (We Love It!), Victory Boulevard (We Love It), Santa Monica Boulevard (We Love It)..."

History

When Van Nuys was plotted in 1911, Victory Boulevard was called 7th Avenue. Around 1916, the name was changed to Leesdale Avenue when the city of Los Angeles annexed the San Fernando Valley after the Los Angeles Aqueduct was completed.  In the mid-1920s, the Leesdale Improvement Association unveiled plans to expand Leesdale Avenue as an -wide "great east-and-west boulevard" through the Valley.  At that time, the City also changed the name to Victory Boulevard, in honor of soldiers returning from World War I, and paved the boulevard as far west as Balboa Boulevard where it ended. Victory Boulevard did not extend to the West Valley until the 1950s.

Transportation
The Metro Local Lines 96 and 164 runs along Victory Boulevard.

Communities (west to east)
 West Hills – west of Shoup Avenue to the Victory Trailhead entrance of Ahmanson Ranch Park in the Simi Hills, Victory Boulevard marks the southern border of West Hills and northern border of adjacent Woodland Hills.
 Woodland Hills – between the western city limits, and Corbin Avenue on the east, Victory Boulevard marks the northern border of Woodland Hills, with West Hills, Canoga Park, and Winnetka to the north.
 Canoga Park – Victory Boulevard marks the southern border of Canoga Park between Shoup, and DeSoto, with Woodland Hills to the south
 Winnetka – DeSoto Avenue is the western boundary, Corbin Avenue is the eastern boundary, with the Los Angeles River and Woodland Hills to the south.
 Reseda – Victory Boulevard marks the southern border of Reseda between Corbin Avenue and White Oak Avenue, with Tarzana to the south..
 Tarzana – Victory Boulevard marks the northern border of Tarzana between Corbin Avenue (west) and Lindley Avenue (east)
 Lake Balboa – between White Oak and I-405 (the San Diego Freeway)
 Encino – Victory Boulevard marks the northern border of Encino between Lindley Avenue and White Oak
 Van Nuys – between I-405 (the San Diego Freeway) and Hazeltine Avenue
 Valley Glen – between Hazeltine Avenue and CA 170 (the Hollywood Freeway)
 North Hollywood – between CA 170 (the Hollywood Freeway) and Clybourn Avenue
 Burbank – between Clybourn Avenue and Allen Avenue
 Glendale – between Allen Avenue and Riverside Drive/Sonora Avenue

Notable landmarks (west to east)

 Upper Las Virgenes Canyon Open Space Preserve (formerly Ahmanson Ranch)— a  public nature preserve park of the Santa Monica Mountains Conservancy, located at the western terminus of Victory Boulevard near the West Hills—Woodland Hills boundary.
 Westfield Topanga – opened in 1964 as Topanga Plaza, California's first enclosed shopping mall, and located on Topanga Canyon Boulevard at Victory Boulevard, Westfield Topanga was extensively renovated from 2006–2008 and features 230 stores including Macy's, Nordstrom, Neiman Marcus, Target, and Apple Store.
 Reseda High School – a public high school in the Los Angeles Unified School District established in 1955; used as the setting for the high school in The Shield, several episodes of Buffy the Vampire Slayer and in the feature film Grosse Pointe Blank.
 Sherman Oaks Center for Enriched Studies – located in Tarzana, SOCES is the largest magnet school in the Los Angeles Unified School District, 1780 students in grades 4–12; #1 High School API test score in LAUSD.

 Birmingham High School, Lake Balboa – built in 1953 on the site of a U.S. Army hospital; from 1976–1979, the San Fernando Valley's first professional sports team, the Los Angeles Skyhawks of the American Soccer League, played their home games at Birmingham Stadium on Victory Boulevard. In May 1967, a rock concert at the football field at Birmingham High featured Jefferson Airplane, The Doors, The Merry-Go-Round, The Peanut Butter Conspiracy, The Sunshine Company, and the Nitty Gritty Dirt Band.
 Lake Balboa – a  lake south of Victory Boulevard filled with water reclaimed from the Tillman Water Reclamation Plant featuring fishing, boating, remote-control boating and jogging/walking.
 Valley Plaza shopping center along Victory and Laurel Canyon Boulevards, opened in 1951 and by 1956 it claimed to cover 100 acres with 1,039,000 square feet of retail space, the third-largest in the nation at that time
 Valhalla Memorial Park Cemetery, North Hollywood – cemetery founded in 1923; the Portal of the Folded Wings, a tribute to the pioneers of aviation, is on the National Register of Historic Places; Valhalla is the burial site of many aviation pioneers and early Hollywood celebrities.
 Griffith Park – located at the eastern terminus of Victory Boulevard, Griffith Park is LA's largest park covering  with attractions including the Autry National Center, Greek Theatre, Griffith Observatory, L.A. Equestrian Center, Los Angeles Zoo, and Travel Town

Gallery of landmarks

References

Streets in the San Fernando Valley
Streets in Los Angeles
Streets in Los Angeles County, California
Boulevards in the United States
Burbank, California
Canoga Park, Los Angeles
Encino, Los Angeles
Glendale, California
Lake Balboa, Los Angeles
North Hollywood, Los Angeles
Reseda, Los Angeles
Tarzana, Los Angeles
Van Nuys, Los Angeles
West Hills, Los Angeles
Winnetka, Los Angeles
Woodland Hills, Los Angeles